This is a list of fossiliferous stratigraphic units in Peru.



List of fossiliferous stratigraphic units

See also 

 List of fossiliferous stratigraphic units in Bolivia
 List of fossiliferous stratigraphic units in Colombia
 List of fossiliferous stratigraphic units in Ecuador
 
 South American land mammal age
 Gomphothere fossils in Peru

References

Bibliography 
 
 

Peruvian Amazon
 
 
 
 

Sechura Basin
 

Chambira Formation
 
 
 

Chilcatay Formation
 
 
 
 

Chota Formation
 

Iñapari Formation
 
 

Madre de Dios Formation
 
 
 

Mogollón Formation
 
 

Moquegua Formation
 
 

Muñani Formation
 

Paracas Formation
 

Pisco Formation
 
 
 
 
 
 
 
 
 
 
 
 
 
 

Pozo Formation
 
 

Soncco Formation
 

Yahuarango Formation
 
 
 

Yumaque Formation
 

Mesozoic
 K. Bandel. 1994. Comparison of Upper Triassic and Lower Jurassic gastropods from the Peruvian Andes (Pucara Group) and the Alps (Cassian Formation). Palaeontographica Abteilung A 233:127-160
 V.E. Benavides-Caceres. 1956. Cretaceous system in northern Peru. Bulletin of the American Museum of Natural History 108(4):1-493
 S. C. Bennett. 1989. A pteranodontid pterosaur from the Early Cretaceous of Peru, with comments on the relationships of Cretaceous pterosaurs. Journal of Paleontology 63(5):669-677
 G. J. Brenner. 1968. Middle Cretaceous spores and pollen from Northeastern Peru. Pollen et Spores 10:341-383
 M. W. Caldwell and G. L. Bell, Jr. 1995. Halisaurus sp. (Mosasauridae) from the Upper Cretaceous (Santonian) of east-central Peru, and the taxonomic utility of mosasaur cervical vertebrae. Journal of Vertebrate Paleontology 15(3):532-544
 A. V. Dhondt and E. Jaillard. 2005. Cretaceous bivalves from Ecuador and northern Peru. Journal of South American Earth Sciences 19:325-342
 W. C. Elsik. 1967. New sporomorph genera from the Upper Cretaceous of Peru. Pollen et Spores 8(3):553-564
 R. Enay, G. Barale, J. Jacay and E. Jaillard. 1996. Upper Tithonian Ammonites and Floras from the Chicama Basin, Northern Peruvian Andes. GeoResearch Forum 1-2:221-234
 O. Haas. 1953. Mesozoic invertebrate faunas of Peru. Bulletin of the American Museum of Natural History 101:1-328
 B. Kummel. 1948. Geological reconnaissance of the Contamana region, Peru. Geological Society America Bulletin 59:1217-1265
 J. M. Lammons. 1970. Pentapsis, a new palynomorph genus from the Cretaceous (Aptian) of Peru. Micropaleontology 16(02):175-178
 P. Mejia-Velazquez, S. R. Manchester, and C. Jaramillo. 2012. Floristic reconstruction of two Lower Cretaceous sections from Peru during the period of early angiosperm diversification and their climatic implications. 13th International Palynological Congress and 9th International Organization of Palaeobotany Conference GS02-GS006
 T. Mourier, P. Bengtson, M. Bonhomme, E. Buge, H. Cappetta, J.-Y. Crochet, M. Feist, K. F. Hirsch, E. Jaillard, G. Laubacher, J. P. Lefranc, M. Moullade, C. Noblet, D. Pons, J. Rey, B. Sigé, Y. Tambareau and P. Taquet. 1988. The Upper Cretaceous–Lower Tertiary marine to continental transition in the Bagua Basin, northern Peru: paleontology, biostratigraphy, radiometry, correlations. Newsletters on Stratigraphy 19(3):143-177
 M. Orchard. 1994. Late Triassic (Norian) conodonts from Peru. Palaeontographica Abteilung A 233:203-208
 P. Prinz. 1985. Stratigraphie und Ammonitenfauna der Pucara-Gruppe (Obertrias-Unterjura) von Nord-Peru [Stratigraphy and ammonite fauna of the Pucara Group (Upper Triassic-Lower Jurassic) in northern Peru]. Palaeontographica Abteilung A 188:153-197
 E. Robert and L. G. Bulot. 2005. Albian ammonite faunas from Peru: The genus Neodeshaesites Casey, 1964. Journal of Paleontology 79(3):611-618
 M. R. Sandy. 1994. Triassic-Jurassic articulate brachiopods from the Pucara Group, central Peru, and description of the brachidial net in the spiriferid Spondylospira. Palaeontographica Abteilung A 233:99-126
 R. W. Scott and A. Aleman. 1984. Stylina columbaris n.sp. in a Lower Cretaceous coral biostrome, Peru. Journal of Paleontology 58(4):1136-1142
 B. Senowbari-Daryan and G. D. Stanley, Jr. 1994. Lower Jurassic marine carbonate deposits in central Peru: stratigraphy and paleontology. Palaeontographica Abteilung A 233:43-56
 B. Senowbari-Daryan. 1994. Mesozoic sponges of the Pucara Group, Peru. Palaeontographica Abteilung A 233:57-74
 M. J. Simms. 1994. Crinoids from the Chambara Formation, Pucara Group, Central Peru. Palaeontographica Abteilung A 233:169-175
 A. B. Smith. 1994. Triassic echinoids from Peru. Palaeontographica Abteilung A 233:177-202
 H. Suzuki, P. Prinz-Grimm, and R. Schmidt-Effing. 2002. Radiolarien aus dem Grenzbereich Hettangium/Sinemurium von Nordperu [Radiolarians from the Hettangian/Sinemurian boundary of northern Peru]. Paläontologische Zeitschrift 76(2):163-187
 J. W. Wells. 1953. Mesozoic Invertebrate Faunas of Peru Part 3. Lower Jurassic Corals from the Arequipa Region. American Museum Novitates (1631)1-14
 J. W. Wells. 1941. Cretaceous and Eocene corals from northwestern Peru. Bulletins of American Paleontology 98(26):1-26

Paleozoic
 K. A. Badyrka, M. E. Clapham, and S. Lopez. 2013. Paleoecology of brachiopod communities during the late Paleozoic ice age in Bolivia (Copacabana Formation, Pennsylvanian-Early Permian). Palaeogeography, Palaeoclimatology, Palaeoecology 387:56-65
 W. Barth. 1972. Das Permokarbon bei Zudanez (Bolivien) und eine Übersicht des Jungpaläozoikums im zentralen Teil der Anden [The Permo-Carboniferous of Zudanez (Bolivia) and a synopsis of Early Paleozoic in the central part of the Andes]. Geologische Rundschau 61(1):249-270
 A. J. Boucot, P. E. Isaacson, and G. Laubacher. 1980. An Early Devonian, Eastern Americas Realm faunule from the coast of southern Peru. Journal of Paleontology 54(2):359-365
 O. A. Derby. 1876. Exploration of Lake Titicaca II. Notice of the Palaeozoic Fossils. Carboniferous fishes from the central western States 3:279-286
 D. M. Erwin, H. W. Pfefferkorn, and V. Alleman. 1994. Early seed plants in the Southern Hemisphere: I. Associated ovulate and microsporangiate organs from the Carboniferous of Peru. Review of Palaeobotany and Palynology 80:19-38
 C. P. Hughes, R. B. Rickards, and A. Williams. 1980. The Ordovician fauna from the Contaya Formation of eastern Peru. Geological Magazine 117(1):1-21
 G. Laubacher, A. J. Boucot, and J. Gray. 1982. Additions to Silurian stratigraphy, lithofacies, biogeography and paleontology of Bolivia and southern Peru. Journal of Paleontology 56(5):1138-1170
 N. D. Newell, J. Chronic, and T.G. Roberts. 1953. Upper Paleozoic of Peru. Geological Society of America Memoir 58:1-276
 A. D. d'Orbigny. 1842. Voyage dans l’Amérique Méridionale 3(4):1-188
 S. Sakagami. 2004. Permian bryozoans from the Lihuirco-Quisuar Route near Abancay, Peru. Bulletin of the National Science Museum, Tokyo, Series C 30:55-88
 S. Sakagami. 1995. Upper Paleozoic bryozoans from the Lake Titicaca region, Bolivia, Part 1. Introductory remarks, stratigraphy and systematic paleontology. Transactions and Proceedings of the Paleontological Society of Japan, N.S. 180:226-260
 J. W. Salter. 1861. On the fossils, from the high Andes, collected by David Forbes, Esq, FRS, FGS. Quarterly Journal of the Geological Society 17:62-73
 E. Villas, J. Colmenar, and J. C. Gutiérrez-Marco. 2015. Late Ordovician brachiopods from Peru and their palaeobiogeographical relationships. Palaeontology 52 
 E. C. Wilson. 1990. Permian corals of Bolivia. Journal of Paleontology 64(1):60-78

.Peru
 
 
Fossil
Fossil